Robert Cooper may refer to:

Politics and law
Robert Cooper (MP for Midhurst), MP for Midhurst in 1384 and 1402
Robert Cooper (MP for Canterbury), MP for Canterbury in 1402
Robert Bransby Cooper (1762–1845), MP for Gloucester
Robert Archer Cooper (1874–1953), governor of South Carolina
Robert Cooper (Canadian politician) (1858–1943), MPP in Ontario, Canada
Robert Cooper (diplomat) (born 1947), British diplomat and author
Robert E. Cooper Sr. (1920–2016), American judge, member of the Tennessee Supreme Court 1974–1990
Robert E. Cooper Jr. (born 1957), American jurist, Attorney General of Tennessee 2006–2014

Sports
Rob Cooper, American college baseball coach
Robert Cooper (footballer), English footballer

Others
Rob Cooper (blues musician), American Texas blues pianist and songwriter
Robert Cowper, also known as Robert Cooper, English Tudor composer
Robert C. Cooper (born 1968), Canadian writer and producer, executive producer of Stargate SG-1 and Stargate Atlantis
Robert Cooper (Australian businessman) (1776–1857), Australian businessman in the early colonial era of Sydney
Robert Cooper (silversmith), active in the  mid 17th century, see Household silver
Robert Cooper, real name of Memphis rapper Koopsta Knicca, former member of rap duo Three 6 Mafia

See also
Bob Cooper (disambiguation)
Bert Cooper (disambiguation)
Robert Cooper Grier (1794–1870), American jurist